Under a Cloud is a 1937 British comedy film directed by George King and starring Betty Ann Davies, Edward Rigby, Hilda Bayley. The screenplay concerns a man who returns from Australia and tries to reconcile with his estranged family.

It was made at Shepperton Studios as a quota quickie for release by Paramount Pictures. The film still survives, unlike a number of quota quickies.

Cast
 Edward Rigby as Jimmy Forbes  
 Betty Ann Davies as Diana Forbes 
 Hilda Bayley as Rosalyn Forbes 
 Bernard Clifton as Georges Forbes  
 Moira Reed as Mary Jessyl  
 Peter Gawthorne as Sir Edmond Jessyl  
 Renee Gadd as Judy St. John  
 Billy Watts as Rodney Marsh  
 Brian Buchel  as Arnold Gill  
Jack Vyvian as Inspector Bryan  
 Howard Douglas as Gambler on Ship

References

Bibliography
 Chibnall, Steve. Quota Quickies: The Birth of the British 'B' Film. British Film Institute, 2007.
 Low, Rachael. Filmmaking in 1930s Britain. George Allen & Unwin, 1985.
 Wood, Linda. British Films, 1927-1939. British Film Institute, 1986.

External links

1937 films
1937 comedy films
British comedy films
Films directed by George King
Films shot at Shepperton Studios
Films set in England
Quota quickies
British black-and-white films
Films scored by Jack Beaver
1930s English-language films
1930s British films